Harry Inglis Dalton (August 23, 1928 – October 23, 2005) was an American front-office executive in Major League Baseball. He served as general manager of three American League (AL) teams, the Baltimore Orioles (1966–71), California Angels (1972–77) and Milwaukee Brewers (1978–91), and was a principal architect of the Orioles' dynasty of 1966–74 as well as the only AL championship the Brewers ever won (1982).

Born in West Springfield, Massachusetts—also the hometown of Baseball Hall of Fame manager Leo Durocher—Dalton graduated from Amherst College and served in the United States Air Force during the Korean War, earning a Bronze Star. After a brief stint as a sportswriter in Springfield, he joined the front office of the Orioles, newly reborn as the relocated St. Louis Browns, in 1954. For the next 11 years, Dalton worked his way up the organizational ladder, rising to the position of director of the Orioles' successful farm system in 1961.

In the autumn of 1965, Baltimore general manager Lee MacPhail departed to become top aide to the new Commissioner of Baseball, William Eckert. Dalton was named Director of Player Personnel—in reality, MacPhail's successor as head of baseball operations. His first order of business was to complete a trade that brought Cincinnati Reds outfielder Frank Robinson to Baltimore for pitchers Milt Pappas and Jack Baldschun and outfielder Dick Simpson. Robinson, 1961 National League Most Valuable Player, was one of the greatest stars in the game, but he had developed a strained relationship with the Cincinnati front office. In Baltimore, he would team with third baseman Brooks Robinson to lead the O's to the 1966 and 1970 World Series championships, and pennants in 1969 and 1971. Dalton was the man who hired Earl Weaver as manager, brought to the Majors young stars such as Bobby Grich and Don Baylor, and acquired key players such as Mike Cuellar, Pat Dobson and Don Buford. (Weaver, Frank Robinson and Brooks Robinson, along with pitching great Jim Palmer, a product of Dalton's farm system, are all in the Hall in Fame.)

Following the 1971 World Series loss to the Pittsburgh Pirates, Dalton resigned as the Orioles' vice president and director of player personnel to accept a five-year contract to become executive vice president and general manager of the California Angels on October 27. He succeeded Dick Walsh, who had been dismissed one week prior on October 20. He acquired Nolan Ryan in a December 1971 trade with the New York Mets, but during Dalton's six seasons in Anaheim the team never posted a winning record. He was stripped of his executive vice president position, which was assigned to Buzzie Bavasi, on October 24, 1977 when Gene Autry assumed a greater role in the team's baseball operations by naming himself president.

One month later, on November 20, 1977, Dalton was hired as general manager of the Milwaukee Brewers. He succeeded Jim Baumer, who had resigned the previous night in a purge which also cost manager Alex Grammas and player development director Al Widmar their jobs. Dalton filled the managerial vacancy when he named Orioles' pitching coach George Bamberger the Brewers' new skipper two months later on January 20, 1978. Milwaukee had a group of talented young players, such as Robin Yount, Cecil Cooper and rookie Paul Molitor, but the nine-year-old franchise had never had a winning season. But, under Dalton and Bamberger, the team quickly gelled into contenders in the American League East Division. By 1981, they made the playoffs and in 1982, Milwaukee won its first and only American League pennant (the Brewers moved to the National League Central Division in 1998). In the 1982 World Series, the "Harvey's Wallbangers" Brewers of manager Harvey Kuenn lost to the St. Louis Cardinals in seven games.

He was relegated to a role as an advisor to Bud Selig on October 8, 1991. His special assistant Sal Bando was promoted to replace him under the title of senior vice president for baseball operations. Dalton, who remained a consultant in the Milwaukee front office through his 1994 retirement, nevertheless was one of the most respected men in baseball, who had trained other successful general managers such as John Schuerholz, Lou Gorman and Dan Duquette, a fellow Amherst alumnus.

On July 24, 2003, Dalton was inducted into the Milwaukee Brewers Walk of Fame outside American Family Field.

Harry Dalton died at age 77 in Scottsdale, Arizona, of complications from Lewy body disease, misdiagnosed as Parkinson’s disease.

Awards and honors
1997 Herb Armstrong Award (for contribution to the Orioles franchise by a non-uniform personnel
 Inducted on the Milwaukee Brewers Wall of Honor

References

External links
 Baseball Hall of Fame candidate profile
Baseball America Executive Database: Harry Dalton

1928 births
2005 deaths
Amherst College alumni
Baltimore Orioles executives
California Angels executives
Deaths from dementia in Arizona
Deaths from Lewy body dementia
Major League Baseball farm directors
Major League Baseball general managers
Milwaukee Brewers executives
People from West Springfield, Massachusetts
United States Air Force personnel of the Korean War